

Financial Times

MBA

Note: This is the only ranked South African business school in this category.

Executive MBA

Note: These are the only ranked South African business schools in this category.

Executive Education Customised

Note: These are the only ranked South African business schools in this category.

Executive Education Open

Note: These are the only ranked South African business schools in this category.

FM Ranking the MBAs 2017 company 
Every year Financial Mail surveys the graduates of South Africa's business schools and the companies, parastatals and government departments that employ them and sponsor their studies. The FM survey assesses graduate and employer perceptions of which of the schools provides the best experience, most strategic thinkers, most relevant learning, earning power, bang for bucks, and a host of other criteria important to getting ahead.

Read the FM's 2017 report here.

PMR.africa

PMR.africa conducts annual national survey on Accredited Business Schools offering MBA degrees in South Africa.

The respondents (employers) rate the MBA graduates and students in the workplace representing accredited Business Schools across 19 attributes/criteria (on a scale of 0.00 – 10.00; where 0.00 = poor, 5.00 = average and 10.00 = outstanding), namely:

19 attributes are measured:
 Academic knowledge
Application of knowledge in the workplace
 Communication skills/abilities
 Emotional intelligence
 Entrepreneurial skills/capacity/abilities
 Environmental awareness
Ethical business conduct
 Financial management
 Human resource management
 Implementation of corporate governance
 Information management
 Innovation
 Insight into sound sustainable development
 International perspective
 Leadership skills/abilities
 Marketing management
 Operational management
 Quantitative abilities/skills
 Strategic management

2017

References

See also
Rankings of universities in South Africa
 College and university rankings

Universities in South Africa
University and college rankings
 
Rankings